Kim Jones (born May 2, 1958) is a retired American marathoner and road runner.  Author of the autobiography, Dandelion Growing Wild.

Early life and education
Kim Jones was born on May 2, 1958 in Sonoma, California. She had a successful high school running career, winning states titles in the 400 meters, 800 meters, and mile.

Distance running career
Jones became a marathoner after seeing Joan Samuelson's victory in the first women's Olympic marathon. She ran her first marathon in 1984, finishing with a time of 2:48:48. She soon began working with coach Benji Durden, himself an elite marathoner, and posted a second-place finish at the 1985 Twin Cities Marathon, with a time of 2:35:59. Jones competed in the marathon at the 1987 World Championships, but she did not finish after hurting her ankle. In 1988, she finished 5th in the Olympic Marathon Trials with a time of 2:32:16. At the 1991 Berlin Marathon, she ran her lifetime best of 2:26:40 while finishing second. Her time in Berlin made Jones the third-fastest woman marathoner for 1991.

Given her performances in 1991, Jones was among the favorites to qualify for the 1992 US Olympic team and, perhaps, even compete for a medal at the Olympics. Jones injured her ankle, however, only weeks before the Olympic Marathon Trials, and despite continuing her training, she earned a "Did not finish" result in the race. Later that year, at the New York City Marathon, Jones was again unable to complete the race, this time dropping out after 17 miles due to breathing problems. Following the marathon, she suffered from bronchitis and was bedridden for a month while recovering from her illness.

She competed in the World Championships marathon again at the 1993 meet. Because of a slow pace early in the race, Jones led the pack from the 5K mark through the first thirty kilometers. At this point, she began to fall back, explaining later that she "got real mad" and "wasted energy" after contact with another runner. She finished the race in 8th place with a time of 2:36:33. Two years later, she again competed at the World Championships in the marathon, this time finishing 16th with a time of 2:37:06. In February 1996, she tried for the third time to qualify for the Olympics in the marathon, but she failed to complete the race due to illness. Then, in June, she ran the 5000 meters at the Olympic Trials, a distance she had not previously run competitively. She told Runner's World that because her "breathing problems don't usually start for 15 minutes or so," she would be able to complete the race before her asthma began bothering her. At the Trials, she finished 7th with a time of 15:53.58.

Marathon performances

Fastest marathon performances

 Plus 12 other performances under 2:33 since 1986

Post-competitive career
Jones raised her two daughters in Spokane, Washington, and currently resides in Fort Collins, Colorado with her husband Jon Sinclair. Since retiring from competition in 1998, she has been a coach with Anaerobic Management, an on-line coaching service for distance runners, as well as a speaker at special events, road races and expos.

References

External links

1958 births
Living people
People from Sonoma, California
Track and field athletes from California
American female long-distance runners
American female marathon runners
21st-century American women